Michalis Antonis "Mike" Bramos (commonly referred to as Michael Bramos), born 27 May 1987, is a Greek-American professional basketball player and the team captain for Umana Reyer Venezia  of the Italian Lega Basket Serie A (LBA) and the EuroCup. Born in Harper Woods, Michigan, he played college basketball for Miami University. In his senior season at Miami, Bramos was named MAC Player of the Year. He is a shooting guard-small forward, standing at 1.98 m (6 ft 6 in), with a 2.13 m (7 ft.) wingspan.

High school career
Bramos attended Grosse Pointe North High School, in Grosse Pointe Woods, Michigan, where he played high school basketball.

College career
After high school, Bramos played college basketball at Miami (Ohio) from 2005 to 2009. With the RedHawks, he was named to the All-Mid-American Conference Second Team in 2008, as a junior. As a senior, he was named to the 2009 All-Mid-American Conference First Team, and he was also named the 2009 Mid-American Conference Player of the Year. In his four seasons with Miami, Bramos appeared in 120 games, averaging 12.6 points, 3.7 rebounds, 1.6 assists, 1 steal, and 1.1 block per game. As of May 2015, Bramos was Miami's sixth all-time leader in points scored, with 1,515, third all-time in blocked shots, with 130, and tenth all-time in steals, with 124.

Professional career
After not being selected in the 2009 NBA draft, Bramos played with the Detroit Pistons' NBA Summer League team in 2009. In August 2009, he joined the Greek Basket League club Peristeri. With Peristeri, he played in all 26 Greek League regular season games, averaging 8.9 points, 2.2 rebounds, and 1.2 assists per game, in 24 minutes of playing time. In 2010, he joined the Spanish ACB League club Gran Canaria.

In 2012, he signed a 3-year contract with Greek EuroLeague-playing club, Panathinaikos, with the first two years of the contract being guaranteed. With Panathinaikos, he won both the Greek Cup and the Greek League in 2013 and 2014. Panathinaikos declined to pick up the team option on the last year of his contract, and he was released by the club on 12 June 2014.

Bramos played with the Atlanta Hawks' NBA Summer League team in 2014, but he injured himself during Summer League play. He was thus sidelined for the entire 2014–15 season.

In August 2015, he was signed for the 2015–16 season by the Italian LBA side Umana Reyer Venezia, after the team had made sure he was fit to play again. On June 28, 2016, he re-signed with Venezia for one more season. In the 2016–17 season, he won the Italian League championship. On July 5, 2017, he signed a contract extension with Venezia, through the year 2019.

National team career
Bramos became a member of the senior men's Greek national basketball team in 2011. With Greece's national team, he played at EuroBasket 2011, the 2012 FIBA World Olympic Qualifying Tournament and at EuroBasket 2013.

Personal life
Bramos' paternal grandfather was originally from Greece, coming from Kardamas, near Amaliada; he met some of his relatives when he played in Greece.

Awards and accomplishments

College
Second-Team All-MAC: (2008)
First-Team All-MAC: (2009)
MAC Player of the Year: (2009)

Professional career
2× Greek League Champion: (2013, 2014)
2× Greek Cup Winner: (2013, 2014)
2× Greek League All-Star: (2013, 2014)
2× Italian League champion: (2017, 2019)

References

External links
 NBA.com Profile
 Euroleague.net Profile
 FIBA Profile (archive)
 FIBA Europe Profile
 Eurobasket.com Profile
 Italian League Profile 
 Greek Basket League Profile 
 Hellenic Federation Profile 
 Spanish League Profile 

1987 births
Living people
American people of Greek descent
American expatriate basketball people in Greece
American expatriate basketball people in Italy
American expatriate basketball people in Spain
American men's basketball players
Basketball players from Michigan
CB Gran Canaria players
Greek men's basketball players
Greek expatriate basketball people in Spain
Greek Basket League players
Lega Basket Serie A players
Liga ACB players
Miami RedHawks men's basketball players
People from Harper Woods, Michigan
Peristeri B.C. players
Panathinaikos B.C. players
Reyer Venezia players
Shooting guards
Small forwards